The Lion of Gripsholm Castle is a notable example of bad taxidermy located in Gripsholm Castle, Sweden. The lion is badly stuffed and is considered to have a comically deformed face.

In 1731, the Bey of Algiers presented King Frederick I of Sweden with a lion, one of the first lions in Scandinavia.  When alive, the lion was kept in a cage near Junibacken. When the lion died, it was stuffed and mounted; however, the taxidermist and the museum-keepers had never actually seen a lion before, and did not know how they were supposed to look. As a result, the resulting mount was especially anatomically inaccurate, most apparent in its face.

In the 21st century, the badly-stuffed lion has been widely mocked.

References

Internet memes
Lions in popular culture
Museums in Södermanland County
Individual taxidermy exhibits
Individual lions